The following are lists of Malayalam films of the 1970s by year.

 Malayalam films of 1970
 Malayalam films of 1971
 Malayalam films of 1972
 Malayalam films of 1973
 Malayalam films of 1974
 Malayalam films of 1975
 Malayalam films of 1976
 Malayalam films of 1977
 Malayalam films of 1978
 Malayalam films of 1979

References

1970s
Lists of 1970s films
1970s in Indian cinema

hi:मलयालम फिल्मों की सूची : 1970s
ml:1971-ൽ പുറത്തിറങ്ങിയ മലയാളചലച്ചിത്രങ്ങളുടെ പട്ടിക